The chief minister of Assam, an Indian state, is the head of the Government of Assam. As per the Constitution of India, the governor is the state's de jure head, but de facto executive authority rests with the chief minister. Following elections to the Assam Legislative Assembly, the governor usually invites the party (or coalition) with a majority of seats to form the government. The governor appoints the chief minister, whose council of ministers are collectively responsible to the assembly. Given that he has the confidence of the assembly, the chief minister's term is for five years and is subject to no term limits.

Since 1946, Assam has had 17 chief ministers. Ten of these belonged to the Indian National Congress, including Gopinath Bordoloi, the first Chief Minister of Assam, and Anwara Taimur, India's first female Muslim chief minister. Congress monopoly in the state was brought to an end when Golap Borbora led the Janata party to victory in the 1978 assembly elections. Borbora consequently became the first non congress Chief Minister of Assam. Prior to that, Borbora was the first member of the non congress opposition to be elected as a Rajya Sabha member from Assam.  Congressman Tarun Gogoi is the longest-serving officeholder, having served for 15 years from 2001 to 2016. Sarbananda Sonowal became the Assam's first chief minister from the Bharatiya Janata Party BJP 
when he was sworn in on 24 May 2016. On 9 May 2021, Himanta Biswa Sarma is announced as the 15th Chief Minister of Assam.

Premiers (1937-50) 
Under the Government of India Act 1935, a bicameral legislature was set up with a legislative assembly and a legislative council. The premier of Assam was the head of the government and leader of the legislative assembly of Assam Province.

Chief ministers

Notes

Timeline

See also
 List of current Indian chief ministers
 List of Governors of Assam

References

 
Assam
Chief Ministers